Luma chequen, the white Chilean myrtle, is a species of flowering plant in the genus Luma in the family Myrtaceae, native  to the central Andes mountains between Chile and Argentina, at latitudes located 30 to 41° South. Synonyms include Eugenia chequen Molina, Myrtus chequen (Molina) Spreng., and Luma gayana (Barn.) Burret. Common names in Spanish include chequén, huillipeta, and arrayán blanco (white myrtle).

It is a shrub (rarely a small tree) growing to 9 m tall, with dull grey-brown bark (unlike the smooth red bark of the related Luma apiculata). It is evergreen, with small fragrant oval leaves 0.5-2.5 cm long and 0.3-1.5 cm broad, and white flowers in early to mid summer. Its fruit is an edible dark purple berry 1 cm in diameter, ripe in early autumn.

It has been introduced as ornamental in the North Pacific Coast of the United States.

Etymology
Luma is a derivation of a vernacular Chilean name for this species.

External links

 Luma chequen in Encyclopedia of the Chilean Flora
 Luma chequen in Chilebosque

Myrtaceae
Flora of Chile
Flora of Argentina